Marj is a city in Libya. 

Marj may also refer to:


Places
 Marj, Iran, a village in Kerman Province
 Marenj, also Romanized as Mārj, a village in Kurdistan Province, Iran
 Marj, Lebanon, a village in tha Beqaa Governorate in Lebanon
 Marj District, a district of Libya

People
Frequently short for Marjorie.
 Marj Carpenter (1926–2020), American reporter and Moderator of the General Assembly of the Presbyterian Church (USA), the church's top position
 Marj Dusay (1936–2020), American actress
 Marj Heyduck (1913–1969), American newspaper reporter, columnist and editor and radio show host
 Marj Mitchell (1948–1983), Canadian curler

Fictional characters
 Marj Brasch, on the New Zealand soap opera Shortland Street

See also
 Marjorie
 Marge (disambiguation)

Hypocorisms
Lists of people by nickname
English-language feminine given names